Seas of Blood is a video game published by Adventure Soft in 1985 for the Amstrad CPC, Commodore 64, and ZX Spectrum.

Gameplay
Seas of Blood is an adaptation of the Fighting Fantasy gamebook, Seas of Blood.

Seas of Blood is a single-player roleplaying gamebook written by Andrew Chapman, illustrated by Bob Harvey and originally published in 1985 by Puffin Books. It forms part of Steve Jackson and Ian Livingstone's Fighting Fantasy series. It is the 16th in the series in the original Puffin series (ISBN 0-14-031951-4). The title was loosely adapted into a text-based video game by company Adventure Soft.

Reception
Zzap!64 reviewed the game, rating it 75% overall, and stated that "the Fighting Fantasy team seem to have done for the company very much what Scott Adams did with the Marvel Superheroes - inject a new burst of energy that has resulted in an above average game."

Reviews
Aktueller Software Markt	(Feb, 1986)
Sinclair User (Jan, 1986)
Computer and Video Games (Feb, 1986)
Crash! (Jan, 1986)
Popular Computing Weekly (Dec 12, 1985)
Amtix! (Feb, 1986)
Computer Gamer (Jan, 1986)

References

1985 video games
Adventure games
Adventure Soft games
Amstrad CPC games
Commodore 64 games
Video games about pirates
Video games based on novels
Video games developed in the United Kingdom
ZX Spectrum games